Arunoday Saha is an Indian Bengali academician, former professor, politician and writer from Agartala, Tripura. He was appointed first vice-chancellor of Tripura University when it became a central university in 2007.

Life 
Saha was born into an Indian Bengali family in Bishalgarh, Tripura. His father, Abani Mohan Saha, was a businessman.

He was a brilliant student. He got B.A. (from Presidency College, Kolkata), M.A. (from Calcutta University) and Ph.D. (from Utah State University) in Economics. He was appointed the first vice-chancellor of Tripura Central University on July 3, 2007 and retired on February 18, 2013.

He is a member of Indian political party, Indian National Congress. He said, "My family has traditionally been with the Congress but this nomination as a Congress candidate for Lok Sabha is slightly unexpected. But as the party has honored me, I will also do my best in the election."

He is a recognized writer. His writings are published in journals and newspapers. He has published some books.

His wife, Prof. Manjari Choudhury, died in 2010.

See also 

 Tripura University
 Bishalgarh
 Tripura West (Lok Sabha constituency)

References

External links 

 https://myneta.info/ls2014/candidate.php?candidate_id=244
https://www.cfo-india.in/cmsarticle/anjan-kumar-ghosh-appointed-as-the-new-vc-of-tripura-university/
https://adrindia.org/content/tripura-poll-6-crorepatis-3-have-criminal-cases
https://planner.inflibnet.ac.in/planner2012/Committee.html
https://cii.in/PhotoGalleryDetail.
 https://www.aarshikatha.co.in/2019/12/folk-fest-high-cmsn-agartala-aarshikatha.html?m=1
https://www.banglanews24.com/public/tripura/news/bd/648135.details
https://tripurainfo.com/BanglaArticle.aspx?intBAID=242

Living people
Tripura politicians
People from Tripura
Writers from Tripura
Indian writers
Heads of universities and colleges in India
Indian academic administrators
Year of birth missing (living people)